Los Mexicles is a Mexican street gang based in Ciudad Juárez, Chihuahua. It is allied to the Sinaloa Cartel, a criminal group based in Sinaloa.

History
Most recent Los Mexicles leader Ernesto Alfredo Piñón de la Cruz, also known as "El Neto," was killed in a shootout with Mexican authorities on 5 January 2023.

References 

Gangs in Texas
Organizations established in 1987
Sinaloa Cartel
Gangs in Mexico
1987 establishments in Texas